The following is a list of notable events and releases of the year 1974 in Norwegian music.

Events

January
Inger Lise Rypdal and Benny Borg win the 1973 Spellemannprisen in the female and male vocalist categories respectively. Christiania Jazzband, Saft, Torkil Bye/Brynjar Hoff, Lillebjørn Nilsen, Bjørn Sand/Totto Osvold and Oddvar Nygaards Kvartett also receive the award. Dizzie Tunes win in the category "Music for children" and Sigbjørn Bernhoft Osa win the Special Award.

April
 5 – The 1st Vossajazz started in Voss, Norway (April 5 – 7).

May
 22
 The 22nd Bergen International Festival started in Bergen, Norway (May 22 – June 5).
 The 2nd Nattjazz started in Bergen, Norway (May 22 – June 5).

August
 25 – The 5th Kalvøyafestivalen started at Kalvøya near by Oslo.

Albums released

Unknown date

B
 Bendik Singers
 Bendik Singers (Triola Records)

F
 Flying Norwegians
 New Day (Sonet Records)

G
 Jan Garbarek
 Belonging (ECM Records) with Keith Jarrett

K
 Karin Krog
 Gershwin With Karin Krog (Polydor Records).
 You Must Believe In Spring (Songs By Michel Legrand) (Polydor Records).
 We Could Be Flying (Polydor Records)

N
 Lillebjørn Nilsen
 ...Og Fia Hadde Sko! (Polydor Records)

R
 Inger Lise Rypdal
 Den Stille Gaten (Talent Records)
 Terje Rypdal
 What Comes After (ECM Records)
 Whenever I Seem To Be Far Away (ECM Records)

S
 Øystein Sunde
 Klå (Philips Records)
 Ikke Bare Tyll (Philips Records)

T
 Arve Tellefsen
 Johan Svendsen: Fiolinkonsert, Op. 6 / Cellokonsert, Op. 7 (Norsk Kulturråds Klassikerserie), with Hege Waldeland (cello) and Filharmonisk Selskaps Orkester, Musikselskabet Harmoniens Orkester, conducted by Karsten Andersen

Deaths

 February 
 20 – David Monrad Johansen, composer (born 1888).

 October
 31 – Olav Gurvin, composer and music conductor (born 1893).

Births

 January
 4
 Sjur Miljeteig, jazztrumpeter, composer, and author.
 Hild Sofie Tafjord, French hornist.
 29 – Daniel "Vrangsinn" Salte, black metal bassist, Carpathian Forest.

 February
 3 – Anders Hunstad, musician and songwriter.
 17 – Bernt Moen, jazz pianist, composer, and music teacher

 March
 27 – Lars Skoglund, contemporary classical composer, guitarist, and drummer.

 April
 1 – Ole Moe, black metal/thrash metal multi-instrumentalist, Aura Noir and Immortal.
 4 – Lars Eikind, rock/ bassist and singer.
 10 – Beate S. Lech, jazz singer, composer and lyricist.
 14 – Christian Blom, composer.
 29 – Børre Dalhaug, jazz drummer, music arranger and music instructor.

 May
 5 – Jens Fredrik Ryland, black metal guitarist, Borknagar.

 June
 9 – Tomas "Samoth" Thormodsæter Haugen, black metal guitarist and multi-instrumentalist.
 11 – Frode Jacobsen, bass guitarist, songwriter and record producer.
 15 – Øystein Greni, singer and guitarist, BigBang.

 July
 7 
 Kenneth Ekornes, jazz percussionist.
 Terje "Tchort" Vik Schei, black metal guitarist, Emperor.
 22 – Kåre Nymark, jazz trumpeter and composer.
 24 – Carl-Michael Eide, black metal drummer, multi-instrumentalist, and vocalist.

August
 5 – Knut Magne Valle, heavy metal guitarist, songwriter, composer.
 23 – Ovidiu Cernăuțeanu, singer-songwriter, producer and musician.

 September
 10 – Lasse Marhaug,  improvisational, jazz, rock and extreme metal electronic musician snf music producer.
 11 – Krister Dreyer, singer, songwriter and multi-instrumentalist.
 15 – Erik Hedin, sound designer and composer.

 October
 7 – Frode Glesnes, Viking metal guitarist, Einherjer.

 November
 7 – Chris Summers, deathpunk drummer, Turbonegro.
 12 – Jørn H. Sværen, author, publisher, translator and musician.
 23 – Frode Kjekstad, jazz guitarist.
 27 – Tom Cato Visnes, black metal bassist, Gorgoroth and Ov Hell.

 December
 17 – Anders Aarum, jazz pianist and composer.
 18 – Knut Schreiner, singer, guitarist and music producer.
 21 – Knut Aalefjær, jazz drummer and composer.
 24 – Paal Nilssen-Love, jazz drummer.

 Unknown date
 Henning Solvang, rock musician, Thulsa Doom.

See also
 1974 in Norway
 Music of Norway
 Norway in the Eurovision Song Contest 1974

References

 
Norwegian music
Norwegian
Music
1970s in Norwegian music